Jaco Fourie (born 19 April 1988) is a South African rugby union player.

References

South African rugby union players
Living people
1988 births
University of Pretoria alumni
Rugby union hookers
Rugby union players from Bloemfontein
Eastern Province Elephants players